Youth of China is the second EP by Chinese singer Li Yuchun, released on April 29, 2008 by Taihe Rye.

Track listing

Music videos
Xiucai Hutong 秀才胡同
Youth of China 少年中国
Poor Student 差生

References

2008 albums
Chinese-language albums
Li Yuchun albums
Mandopop albums
Pop albums by Chinese artists